In music theory, a ninth chord is a chord that encompasses the interval of a ninth when arranged in close position with the root in the bass.

Heinrich Schenker and also Nikolai Rimsky-Korsakov allowed the substitution of the dominant seventh, leading-tone, and leading tone half-diminished seventh chords, but rejected the concept of a ninth chord on the basis that only that on the fifth scale degree (V9) was admitted and that inversion was not allowed of the ninth chord.

Dominant ninth

There is a difference between a major ninth chord and a dominant ninth chord. A dominant ninth is the combination of a dominant chord (with a minor seventh) and a major ninth. A major ninth chord (e.g., Cmaj9), as an extended chord, adds the major seventh along with the ninth to the major triad. Thus, a Cmaj9 consists of C, E, G, B and D. When the symbol "9" is not preceded by the word "major" or "maj" (e.g., C9), the chord is a dominant ninth. That is, the implied seventh chord is a dominant seventh, i.e. a major triad plus the minor seventh, to which the ninth is added: e.g., a C9 consists of C, E, G, B and D. C dominant ninth (C9) would usually be expected to resolve to an F major chord (the implied key, C being the dominant of F). The ninth is commonly chromatically altered by half-step either up or down to create more tension and dissonance. Fétis tuned the chord 4:5:6:7:9.

In the common practice period, "the root, 3rd, 7th, and 9th are the most common factors present in the V9 chord," with the 5th, "typically omitted". The ninth and seventh usually resolve downward to the fifth and third of I.

Example of tonic dominant ninth chords include Bobbie Gentry's "Ode to Billie Joe" and Wild Cherry's "Play That Funky Music". James Brown's "I Got You (I Feel Good)" features a striking dominant 9th arpeggio played staccato at the end of the opening 12-bar sequence. The opening phrase of Chopin's well-known "Minute Waltz" climaxes on a dominant 9th chord:

César Franck's Violin Sonata in A Major opens with a dominant ninth chord (E9) in the piano part. When the violin enters in the fifth bar, its melody articulates an arpeggio of this chord.

Debussy's "Hommage a Rameau", the second of his first Book of Images for piano solo climaxes powerfully on a dominant 9th, expressed both as a chord and as a wide-ranging arpeggio:

The starting point of Karlheinz Stockhausen's piece for vocal sextet, Stimmung (1968) is a chord consisting of the notes B, F, B, D, A and C. According to Nicholas Cook, Stimmung could, in terms of conventional tonal harmony, be viewed as "simply a dominant ninth chord that is subject to timbral variation. The notes the performers sing are harmonics 2, 3, 4, 5, 7, and 9 of the implied but absent fundamental—the B flat below the bass clef."

Dominant minor ninth

(Dominant minor ninth chord on C)
A dominant minor ninth chord consists of a dominant seventh chord and a minor ninth. In C: C E G B D. Fétis tuned the chord 8:10:12:14:17. In notation for jazz and popular music, this chord is often denoted, e.g., C79. In Schubert's Erlkönig, a terrified child calls out to his father when he sees an apparition of the sinister Elf King. The dissonant voicing of the dominant minor ninth chord used here (C79) is particularly effective in heightening the drama and sense of threat.

(Excerpt from Schubert's Erlkönig – Link to passage)

Writing about this passage, Taruskin (2010, p. 149) remarks on the 

(Excerpt from Mariah Carey – All I want for Christmas is You)

Minor ninth

(C minor ninth chord)
The minor ninth chord consists of a minor seventh chord and a major ninth. The formula is 1, 3, 5, 7, 9. This chord is written as Cm9. This chord has a more "bluesy" sound and fits very well with the dominant ninth.

Major ninth

Notable examples 
 "Wedding Day at Troldhaugen" (Edvard Grieg)
 "In una stanza con poca luce" (Ennio Morricone: Once Upon a Time in the West soundtrack no. 18)

The major ninth chord consists of a major seventh chord and a major ninth. The formula is 1, 3, 5, 7, 9. This chord is written as Cmaj9.

Relation to other chords with the ninth

 The 6/9 chord is a pentad with a major triad joined by a sixth and ninth above the root, but no seventh. For example, C6/9 is C–E–G–A–D. It is not a tense chord requiring resolution, and is considered a substitute for the tonic in jazz. The minor 6/9 chord is a minor triad with an added 6th and 9th, evoking the Dorian mode, and is also suitable as a minor tonic in jazz.

The second degree is octave equivalent to the ninth. The ninth chord could be alternatively notated as seventh added second chord (C7add2), from where omitting the 3rd produces the seventh suspended second chord (C7sus2).

An added ninth chord is a major triad with an added ninth – Cadd9 consists of C, E, G and D. Added ninth chords differ from other ninth chords because the seventh is not included.

See also
Jazz chord
Dominant seventh sharp ninth chord

References

Chord factors